is one of the Expressways of Japan from Ebino to Miyazaki linking with the Higashikyushu Expressway. It runs through the southern half of the Miyazaki prefecture.

History 
 March 4, 1976, the Ebino Junction with the Kyushu Expressway to Takaharu Interchange was opened.
 March 17, 1981, a section from Takaharu to Miyakonojō Interchanges was opened to traffic.
 October 29, 1981, a section from Miyakonojō to Miyazaki Interchanges was opened to traffic which made the Miyazaki Expressway from Ebino to Miyazaki fully accessible with no gaps. 
 March 25, 2000, the Kiyotake Junction to the east was opened to traffic.
 October 1, 2005, Following privatisation of JH it came under the control of NEXCO West Japan.

Interchanges 

 IC - interchange, SIC - smart interchange, JCT - junction, SA - service area, PA - parking area, BS - bus stop, TN - tunnel, BR - bridge
 Bus stops labeled "○" are currently in use; those marked "◆" are closed.

Lanes 

 4-lane

References

Expressways in Japan
Kyushu region